John Stinson may refer to:

 John Stinson (Canadian politician) (1764–1842), political figure in Upper Canada
 John O. Stinson (died 2021), American civil engineer and town administrator
 J. T. Stinson (John T. Stinson; 1866–1958), academic fruit specialist

See also
Jonathan Stinson (fl. 2000s–2010s), American singer and composer of opera